Tropheops macrophthalmus is a species of cichlid endemic to Lake Malawi.  This species can reach a length of  TL.  It can also be found in the aquarium trade.

References

macrophthalmus
Cichlid fish of Africa
Fish of Lake Malawi
Fish described in 1926
Taxa named by Ernst Ahl
Taxonomy articles created by Polbot